Darmbach (in its middle course: Landwehr, in its lower course: Landgraben) is a river of Hesse, Germany. It flows through Darmstadt, and flows into the Schwarzbach in Trebur.

See also
List of rivers of Hesse

References

Rivers of Hesse
Rivers of Germany